Nasib Al Matni (1910–1958) was a Lebanese journalist who was assassinated on 8 May 1958. He established several publications and edited various newspapers. His assassination triggered the events which led to a political crisis in Lebanon. The murder of Al Matni is one of the unsolved cases in Lebanon.

Biography
Al Matni was born in 1910. He descended from a Maronite family. 

Al Matni was the president of the Lebanese Press Federation. During the presidency of Bechara El Khoury he was one of the leading dissidents in Lebanon. In 1952 Al Matni was arrested and tried which was protested through a three-day strike. He was also a critic of the President Camille Chamoun and held pro-Nasserist views.

Assassination
He was assassinated in his office in West Beirut on 8 May 1958. During the incident he was the owner and editor-in-chief of The Telegraph which was supported by the Sunni opposition in Lebanon. The paper was a leftist and pan-Arabist daily publication which criticized the policies of President Chamoun. In the last editorial published in the paper Al Matni repeated his call for the resignation of President Chamoun and added:Lebanon’s interests, Lebanon’s eternal independence, and the interest of the people make it essential for the individual to sacrifice himself for the benefit of the whole.

The officials claimed that his killing was not due to a political reason, but the opposition figures argued that he was killed due to his anti-Chamoun stance. Because following his assassination numerous threatening letters were found which asked him to stop his criticisms against President Chamoun.

Aftermath
Following his assassination Kamal Jumblatt and other opposition leaders asked the Lebanese people to organize a general strike which led to large-scale protests in Beirut and Tripoli. The first protests took place on the day of Al Matni's funeral in Akkar, Miniyeh, Chouf, Biqa and Sidon. These demonstrations soon expanded to other Lebanese cities. Muslims, Druzes and those Christians who opposed to President Chamoun participated in these protests which lasted between 9 May and 14 October. During these events nearly 3,000 people died.

Several media outlets blamed President Chamoun and the Syrian Social Nationalist Party for the murder of Al Matni. Al Amal, official organ of the Kataeb Party, reported that Al Matni was the father of jihad and that the state should arrest the murderers. Al Anbaa, media outlet of the Progressive Socialist Party, and An Nahar also demanded the arrest of the perpetrators.

References

20th-century Lebanese writers
20th-century journalists
20th-century newspaper founders
1910 births
1958 deaths
Assassinated Lebanese journalists
Deaths by firearm in Lebanon
Lebanese democracy activists
Lebanese left-wing activists
Lebanese Maronites
Lebanese newspaper founders
Terrorism deaths in Lebanon